R. Pampalli is a village in the Uyyalawada block of Kurnool district in Andhra Pradesh, India.

Etymology
The original, full name of the village is Renati papampalli. The village is very famous for the great Dattatrya temple.

References 

Villages in Kurnool district